Upper Denton is a civil parish in the Carlisle district of Cumbria, England.  It contains ten buildings that are recorded in the National Heritage List for England.  Of these, one is listed at Grade I, the highest of the three grades, two are at Grade II*, the middle grade, and the others are at Grade II, the lowest grade.  Hadrian's Wall (the Roman Wall) passes through the parish, and a stretch of the wall is listed.  Many of the buildings are constructed from stone taken from the wall, and one listed building, Willowford and its attached farm buildings, is built between the wall and its vallum.  Two of the listed buildings originated as bastle houses, and the other listed buildings comprise farmhouses, farm buildings, houses, a redundant church, and a railway bridge.


Key

Buildings

Notes and references

Notes

Citations

Sources

Lists of listed buildings in Cumbria